Judy Norton (born January 29, 1958) is an American actress and theater director who is best known for her role as Mary Ellen Walton on The Waltons television series and subsequent Waltons TV movies.

Personal life 
She was born in Santa Monica, California, to parents Harry and Constance (née Glazebrook) Norton. She began practicing Scientology at age 13, and became a minister in the Church. She married Douglas Taylor in 1976 at the age of 18; the marriage ended in divorce in 1978.  She then married former football player Lynn Hughes whom she later divorced.

Still being viewed as a child actress in her early 20s, Norton posed nude for the August 1985 issue of Playboy in a bid to shed her wholesome "family" image. In 1991, Norton married Randy Apostle. They had one son, Devin, before divorcing in 2001.

Norton is married to Robert Graves. Norton has been writing, directing and starring in movies and theater. She also is a singer.  An avid athlete, Norton has participated in competitive horse jumping and skydiving, in addition to skiing and tennis. Norton frequently showcased her athletic skills on Battle of the Network Stars in the late 1970s and early 1980s. Her CD Reflections was released in August 2016.

Filmography

Television

Music

References

External links 
 
 

1958 births
Living people
American Scientologists
American television actresses
21st-century American women
The Waltons